The final results of the Azadegan League 2002–03 season were:

 Shahid Ghandi and Sanaye Arak promoted from the 2003-04 Azadegan League.

References

Azadegan League seasons
Iran
2002–03 in Iranian football leagues